Moche (also spelled mochi or muchi) are Pampangan glutinous rice balls with a bean paste filling. Made from galapong (ground-soaked glutinous rice) and filled with mung- or red bean paste, it is shaped into balls or ovals. Bukayo (caramel grated coconut) may also be used. It is boiled in water until it floats. It is then sprinkled with sesame seeds or crushed peanuts and served hot with a sauce made from sweetened coconut milk (gata).

Despite the similarity in name and ingredients, moche is not derived from the Japanese mochi or muchi. It is derived from buchi (or butsi), the Chinese-Filipino version of jian dui. Unlike buchi, the surface is not browned. The dish is related to the Tagalog mache and Cebuano masi.

See also
Kakanin
Palitaw
Sapin sapin

References

Rice dishes
Philippine desserts
Philippine rice dishes
Foods containing coconut